Systematic musicology is an umbrella term, used mainly in Central Europe, for several subdisciplines and paradigms of musicology. "Systematic musicology has traditionally been conceived of as an interdisciplinary science, whose aim it is to explore the foundations of music from different points of view, such as acoustics, physiology, psychology, anthropology, music theory, sociology, and aesthetics." The most important subdisciplines today are music psychology, sociomusicology (music sociology), philosophy of music (music philosophy), music acoustics (physics of music), cognitive neuroscience of music, and the computer sciences of music (including sound and music computing, music information retrieval, and computing in musicology). These subdisciplines and paradigms tend to address questions about music in general, rather than specific manifestations of music. In the Springer Handbook of Systematic Musicology, "(the) sections follow the main topics in the field, Musical Acoustics, Signal Processing, Music Psychology, Psychophysics/Psychoacoustics, and Music Ethnology while also taking recent research trends into consideration, like Embodied Music Cognition and Media Applications. Other topics, like Music Theory or Philosophy of Music are incorporated in the respective sections."

In the European tripartite model of musicology, musicology is regarded as a combination of three broad subdisciplines: ethnomusicology, music history (or historical musicology), and systematic musicology. Ethnomusicology and historical musicology are primarily concerned with specific manifestations of music such as performances, works, traditions, genres, and the people who produce and engage with them (musicians, composers, social groups). Systematic musicology is different in that it tends not to put these specific manifestations in the foreground, although it of course refers to them. Instead, more general questions are asked about music. These questions tend to be answered either by analysing empirical data (based on observation) or by developing theory – or better, by a combination of both. The 19th-century positivist dream of discovering "laws" of music (by analogy to "laws" in other disciplines such as physics; cf. Adler, 1885), and of defining the discipline of systematic musicology in terms of such laws, slowly evaporated. Ideological trends stemming from modernism and later post-structuralism fundamentally altered the nature of the project.

Since systematic musicology brings together several parent disciplines, it is often regarded as being intrinsically interdisciplinary, or as a system of interacting subdisciplines (hence the alternative name "systemic"). However, most systematic musicologists focus on just one or a select few of the many subdisciplines. Systematic musicologists who are oriented toward the humanities often make reference to fields such as aesthetics, philosophy, semiotics, hermeneutics, music criticism, Media studies, Cultural studies, gender studies, and (theoretic) sociology. Those who are oriented toward science tend to regard their discipline as empirical and data-oriented, and to borrow their methods and ways of thinking from psychology, acoustics, psychoacoustics, physiology, cognitive science, and (empirical) sociology.

More recently emerged areas of research which at least partially are in the scope of systematic musicology comprise cognitive musicology, neuromusicology, biomusicology, and music cognition including embodied music cognition. As an academic discipline, systematic musicology is closely related to practically oriented disciplines such as music technology, music information retrieval, and musical robotics.

Systematic musicology is less unified than its sister disciplines historical musicology and ethnomusicology. Its contents and methods are more diverse and tend to be more closely related to parent disciplines, both academic and practical, outside of musicology. The diversity of systematic musicology is to some extent compensated for by interdisciplinary interactions within the system of subdisciplines that make it up.

The origins of systematic musicology in Europe can be traced to ancient Greece; philosophers such as Pythagoras, Aristotle, Plato and Aristoxenus asked general questions about music. Historical musicology and ethnomusicology are much younger disciplines, and the relative importance of the three has fluctuated considerably during the past few centuries. Today, musicology's three broad subdisciplines are of approximately equal size in terms of the volume of research activity.

References

Further reading 
Rolf Bader (ed.) (2018). Springer Handbook of Systematic Musicology. Berlin, Heidelberg: Springer. 
Mauricio Toro, Carlos Agon, Camilo Rueda, Gerard Assayag (2016). "GELISP: A Framework to Represent Musical Constraint Satisfaction Problems and Search Strategies". Journal of Theoretical and Applied Information Technology 86 (2). 327–331. 
Clarke, Eric, & Cook, Nicholas (eds.) (2004). Empirical musicology: Aims, methods, prospects. Oxford: Oxford University Press.
Dahlhaus, Carl (1997). "Musikwissenschaft und Systematische Musikwissenschaft". In C. Dahlhaus & H. de la Motte-Haber (eds.), Systematische Musikwissenschaft. Laaber, Germany: Laaber-Verlag.
Elschek, Oskar (1993). "Systematische Musikwissenschaft und Persönlichkeitsgeschichte". Systematische Musikwissenschaft, 1/2, 309–338.
Fricke, Jobst Peter (2003). "Systemische Musikwissenschaft". In K. W. Niemöller & B. Gätjen (eds.), Perspektiven und Methoden einer Systemischen Musikwissenschaft (pp. 13–23). Frankfurt: Lang.
Honing, Henkjan (2004). "The comeback of systematic musicology: New empiricism and the cognitive revolution". Tijdschrift voor Muziektheorie [Dutch Journal of Music Theory], 9(3), 241–244.
Honing, Henkjan (2006). "On the growing role of observation, formalization and experimental method in musicology". Empirical Musicology Review, 1 (1).
Huron, David (1999). "The new empiricism: Systematic musicology in a postmodern age". Lecture 3 from the 1999 Ernest Bloch Lectures.
Jiranek, Jaroslav (1993). "Innerdisziplinäre Beziehungen der Musikwissenschaft". Systematische Musikwissenschaft, 1/2, 128–130.
Leman, Marc, & Schneider, Albrecht (1997). "Systematic, cognitive and historical approaches in musicology". In M. Leman (ed.), Music, Gestalt, and Computing (pp. 13–29). Berlin: Springer-Verlag.
Leman, M. (2008). "Systematic musicology at the crossroads of modern music research". In A. Schneider (ed.), Systematic and Comparative Musicology: Concepts, Methods, Findings (pp. 89–115). Frankfurt am Main: Peter Lang.
Motte-Haber, Helga de la (1997). "Umfang, Methode und Ziel der Systematischen Musikwissenschaft". In C. Dahlhaus & H. de la Motte-Haber (eds.), Systematische Musikwissenschaft (pp. 1–24). Laaber, Germany: Laaber-Verlag.
Parncutt, R. (2007). "Systematic musicology and the history and future of Western musical scholarship". Journal of Interdisciplinary Music Studies, 1, 1–32.
Schneider, Albrecht (1993). "Systematische Musikwissenschaft: Traditionen, Ansätze, Aufgaben". Systematische Musikwissenschaft, 1/2, 145–180.
Schumacher, R. (2003). "Systematische Musikwissenschaft: Eine Stellungnahme aus der Perspektive der Musikethnologie". In K. W. Niemöller & B. Gätjen (eds.), Perspektiven und Methoden einer Systemischen Musikwissenschaft (pp. 41–48). Frankfurt: Lang.

Musicology